Megalaemyia punctulata is a species of ulidiid or picture-winged fly in the genus Megalaemyia of the family Ulidiidae.

References

Ulidiidae